Daniel Björkgren (14 September 1939 – 16 November 1992) was a Swedish racewalker. He finished 13th in the 50 km walk at the 1972 Summer Olympics and at the 1974 European Championships. He won a silver medal in the 20 km at the 1969 Nordic Race Walking Championships.

References

1939 births
1992 deaths
Athletes (track and field) at the 1972 Summer Olympics
Swedish male racewalkers
Olympic athletes of Sweden
Place of birth missing
20th-century Swedish people